The Dodhara Chandani Bridge (Nepali: दोधारा चाँदनी पुल), commonly known as Mahakali Bridge is a suspension bridge  for pedestrians and at this point only about 1496.5 m long over  Mahakali River in the far west of Nepal.

Location
One of the longest Multi-span Pedestrian Bridges in Nepal is located in the Kanchanpur district in the Mahakali zone in the Far-Western Development Region, Nepal. It connects the two villages Dodhara and Chandani separated by the Mahakali River in Kanchanpur District. The bridge in the Mahakali Zone Management connects the Nepalese territories near Indo-Nepal border cut off by the river.

The bridge is located about 12km  Southwest of Bhimdatta Municipality (until 2008 known as Mahendranagar), 8  km below the Mahakali Dam and 5.5 km south and below the Indian. South and downriver is the Indian border around 11.4 km away.

Description
The Dodhara Chandani Bridge is a sequence of four suspension bridges with eight pylons, which are anchored to large anchor blocks on both banks as well as three common anchor blocks in the river bed. The lands between the  pylons have a wingspan of 225.40 m, the webs between the anchors and the pylons have a wingspan of almost 70 meters. The bridge segments are curved slightly upwards. The result is a series of arches of spans of 70 + 225.40 + 70 + 70 + 70 + 70 + 225.40 + 225.40 + 70 + 70 + 70 + 225.40 with a total length of 1452.96 m plus of approximately 20 m long anchor blocks on the banks.

The bridge consists of the steel pylons and essentially of wire ropes. The hangers are thin metal rods, which are connected to each other with eyes. The  bridge deck is a sturdy metal grille. On both sides serve ropes as handrails, which are connected by wire mesh with the bridge deck. Diagonal cables between the railings and the underlying longitudinal cables are used for stiffening, as well as some stay cables of the pylons for the bridge deck. Side, anchored in the riverbed ropes dampen fluctuations.

The bridge is designed as a pedestrian bridge, but bicycles and motorcycles can use the bridge as well. There is enough room so that motorcycles can pass even if they are fully loaded. All traffic travels on the left-hand side, as everywhere else in Nepal.

See also
 Baglung Parbat Footbridge
 Kothiyaghat bridge
 Baluakot Bridge
 Jauljibi Bridge
 Jhoolaghat Bridge
 Karnali Bridge
 Narayani Bridge
 Sankhamul Bridge
 Sino-Nepal Friendship Bridge

References

External links

  Dodhara Chandani Bridge
 Mahakali Bridge Mahakali Bridge on India & Nepal Broder

Bridges in Nepal
Suspension bridges
Tourism in Nepal
Footbridges
2005 establishments in Nepal